Evolution is the debut album led by the American trombonist Grachan Moncur III, recorded in 1963 and released on the Blue Note label. Moncur’s band consists of alto saxophonist Jackie McLean, trumpeter Lee Morgan, vibraphonist Bobby Hutcherson, bassist Bob Cranshaw and drummer Tony Williams. Two McLean albums also recorded for Blue Note in 1963 (One Step Beyond and Destination... Out!) featured Moncur and his compositions, and explored the same “inside/outside” musical approach.

Reception

The AllMusic review by Steve Huey stated: "With such an inventive debut, it's a shame Moncur didn't record more as a leader, which makes Evolution an even more important item for fans of Blue Note's avant-garde to track down".

The authors of The Penguin Guide to Jazz described as "an invigorating and intellectually satisfying set," commenting "the whole record has a dark, misterioso quality that the lowering trombone sound... strongly accentuates."

Track listing
All compositions by Grachan Moncur III
 "Air Raid" - 9:19
 "Evolution" - 12:24
 "The Coaster" - 11:39
 "Monk in Wonderland" - 7:54

Personnel
Grachan Moncur III – trombone
Lee Morgan – trumpet
Jackie McLean – alto saxophone
Bobby Hutcherson – vibes
Bob Cranshaw – double bass
Tony Williams – drums

References

1964 debut albums
Blue Note Records albums
Grachan Moncur III albums
Albums recorded at Van Gelder Studio
Albums produced by Alfred Lion